The black inca (Coeligena prunellei) is a species of hummingbird in the "brilliants", tribe Heliantheini in subfamily Lesbiinae. It is endemic to Colombia.

Taxonomy and systematics

In the mid-1800s the black inca was placed in genera Bourcieria and Lamproygia by different authors. By the early 1900s it and most other current members of genus Coeligena were placed in genus Helianthea. The incas have been in their current placement since the mid-1900s. The black inca, bronzy inca (C. coeligena), and brown inca (C. wilsoni) are sister species.

The black inca is monotypic.

Description

Both sexes have a long, straight, black bill and a white spot behind the eye. Adult males' upperparts are purplish black with dark metallic blue shoulders and a black forked tail. Their underparts are also dark purplish black with an iridescent blue-green gorget and a white patch on each side of the breast. Adult females are essentially the same as males but duller, with a longer bill, less blue on the shoulders, and a less forked tail. Immatures are duller than the adults and do not have a gorget.

Distribution and habitat

The black inca is endemic to Colombia. It is found on the west slope of the Eastern Andes from southeastern Santander and western Boyacá departments south into western Cundinamarca Department, and also on both slopes of Serranía de los Yariguíes in Santander. It mostly inhabits the interior of humid montane forest, especially those dominated by oaks, but males are also found in fragmented forest and other human-modified landscapes.

Behavior

Movement

The black inca's movements, if any, are not known.

Feeding
 
The black inca mostly forages for nectar by trap-lining, visiting a circuit of a wide variety of flowering plants, though it occasionally defends concentrated flower patches. It nectars at mid-levels within forest and low levels at the edges. It prefers tubular red and yellow flowers such as those of genera Fuchsia, Bomarea, Aetanthus, Aphelandra, Palicourea, Psammisia, and Thibaudia. It prefers native plants when they are abundant but in one study frequented plants of genus Abutilon and other introduced species. In addition to feeding on nectar, the black inca gleans small arthropods from foliage.

Breeding

The black inca's breeding season is not well known but could be as long as from June to February. Only two nests are known. They were cups of tree fern scales cemented with spider silk and lined with plant down. The species' incubation times and time to fledging are not known.

Vocalization

The black inca is generally quiet but does produce short ick or pip notes.

Status

The IUCN originally assessed the black inca as Threatened. It changed the assessement to Vulnerable in 1994, to Endangered in 2000, and back to Vulnerable in 2008. Its population is estimated at fewer than 10,000 mature individuals and is believed to be decreasing. Colombian authorities consider it endangered. About 90% of the forest habitat in its small range has been cleared for settlement or agriculture and what remains is fragmented.

References

External links

black inca
Birds of the Colombian Andes
Endemic birds of Colombia
black inca
black inca
Taxonomy articles created by Polbot